Lightning was a steel inverted roller coaster located at Kuwait Entertainment City in Kuwait City. The ride opened in 2004 and was built by Swiss manufacturers Bolliger & Mabillard. Lightning's layout was identical to that of the Batman: The Ride clone that appears in many Six Flags parks in the United States. The coaster closed along with the park on June 6, 2016, and was subsequently removed in October 2020. It is the third Bolliger & Mabillard roller coaster to be demolished, after the two Dueling Dragon coasters in Universal Studios.

References

External links
Kuwait Entertainment City - official website

Roller coasters in Kuwait
Roller coasters introduced in 2004

Inverted roller coasters manufactured by Bolliger & Mabillard